New France was the territory colonized by France in North America, beginning with the exploration of the Gulf of Saint Lawrence by Jacques Cartier in 1534 and ending with the cession of New France to Great Britain and Spain in 1763 under the Treaty of Paris.

A vast Viceroyalty, New France consisted of five colonies at its peak in 1712, each with its own administration: Canada, the most developed colony, which was divided into the districts of Québec, Trois-Rivières, and Montréal; Hudson Bay; Acadie in the northeast; Terre-Neuve (Plaisance) on the island of Newfoundland; and Louisiane. It extended from Newfoundland to the Canadian Prairies and from Hudson Bay to the Gulf of Mexico, including all the Great Lakes of North America.

In the 16th century, the lands were used primarily to draw from the wealth of natural resources such as furs through trade with the various indigenous peoples. In the seventeenth century, successful settlements began in Acadia and in Quebec. In the 1713 Treaty of Utrecht, France ceded to Great Britain its claims over mainland Acadia, Hudson Bay, and Newfoundland. France established the colony of Île Royale on Cape Breton Island, where they built the Fortress of Louisbourg.

The population rose slowly but steadily. In 1754, New France's population consisted of 10,000 Acadians, 55,000 Canadiens, and about 4,000 settlers in upper and lower Louisiana; 69,000 in total. The British expelled the Acadians in the Great Upheaval from 1755 to 1764, which has been remembered on July 28 each year since 2003. Their descendants are dispersed in the Maritime provinces of Canada and in Maine and Louisiana, with small populations in Chéticamp, Nova Scotia and the Magdalen Islands. Some also went to France.

After the Seven Years' War (which included the French and Indian War in America), France ceded the rest of New France to Great Britain and Spain in the Treaty of Paris of 1763 (except the islands of Saint Pierre and Miquelon). Britain acquired Canada, Acadia, and French Louisiana east of the Mississippi River, except for the Île d'Orléans, which was granted to Spain with the territory to the west. In 1800, Spain returned its portion of Louisiana to France under the secret Treaty of San Ildefonso, and Napoleon Bonaparte sold it to the United States in the Louisiana Purchase of 1803, permanently ending French colonial efforts on the American mainland.

New France eventually became absorbed within the United States and Canada, with the only vestige of French rule being the tiny islands of Saint Pierre and Miquelon, an overseas collectivity of France. In the United States, the legacy of New France includes numerous place names as well as small pockets of French-speaking communities.

Early exploration (1523–1650s)
Around 1523, the Florentine navigator Giovanni da Verrazzano convinced King Francis I to commission an expedition to find a western route to Cathay (China). Late that year, Verrazzano set sail in Dieppe, crossing the Atlantic on a small caravel with 50 men. After exploring the coast of the present-day Carolinas early the following year, he headed north along the coast, eventually anchoring in the Narrows of New York Bay.

The first European to visit the site of present-day New York, Verrazzano named it Nouvelle-Angoulême in honour of the king, the former count of Angoulême. Verrazzano's voyage convinced the king to seek to establish a colony in the newly discovered land. Verrazzano gave the names Francesca and Nova Gallia to that land between New Spain (Mexico) and English Newfoundland.

In 1534, Jacques Cartier planted a cross in the Gaspé Peninsula and claimed the land in the name of King Francis I. It was the first province of New France. The first settlement of 400 people, Fort Charlesbourg-Royal (present-day Quebec City), was attempted in 1541 but lasted only two years.

French fishing fleets continued to sail to the Atlantic coast and into the St. Lawrence River, making alliances with Canadian First Nations that became important once France began to occupy the land. French merchants soon realized the St. Lawrence region was full of valuable fur-bearing animals, especially the beaver, which were becoming rare in Europe. Eventually, the French crown decided to colonize the territory to secure and expand its influence in America.

Another early French attempt at settlement in North America took place in 1564 at Fort Caroline, now Jacksonville, Florida. Intended as a haven for Huguenots, Caroline was founded under the leadership of René Goulaine de Laudonnière and Jean Ribault. It was sacked by the Spanish led by Pedro Menéndez de Avilés who slaughtered every Protestant there and then established the settlement of St. Augustine on 20 September 1565.

Acadia and Canada (New France) were inhabited by indigenous nomadic Algonquian peoples and sedentary Iroquoian peoples. These lands were full of unexploited and valuable natural resources, which attracted all of Europe. By the 1580s, French trading companies had been set up, and ships were contracted to bring back furs. Much of what transpired between the indigenous population and their European visitors around that time is not known, for lack of historical records.

Other attempts at establishing permanent settlements were also failures. In 1598, a French trading post was established on Sable Island, off the coast of Acadia, but was unsuccessful. In 1600, a trading post was established at Tadoussac, but only five settlers survived the winter.

In 1604, a settlement was founded at Île-Saint-Croix on Baie François (Bay of Fundy), which was moved to Port-Royal in 1605. It was abandoned in 1607, re-established in 1610, and destroyed in 1613, after which settlers moved to other nearby locations, creating settlements that were collectively known as Acadia, and the settlers as Acadians.

Foundation of Quebec City (1608)

In 1608, King Henry IV sponsored Pierre Dugua, Sieur de Mons and Samuel de Champlain as founders of the city of Quebec with 28 men. This was the second permanent French settlement in the colony of Canada. Colonization was slow and difficult. Many settlers died early because of harsh weather and diseases. In 1630, there were only 103 colonists living in the settlement, but by 1640, the population had reached 355.

Champlain allied himself with the Algonquin and Montagnais peoples in the area, who were at war with the Iroquois, as soon as possible. In 1609, Champlain and two French companions accompanied his Algonquin, Montagnais, and Huron allies south from the St. Lawrence Valley to Lake Champlain. He participated decisively in a battle against the Iroquois there, killing two Iroquois chiefs with the first shot of his arquebus. This military engagement against the Iroquois solidified Champlain's status with New France's Huron and Algonquin allies, enabling him to maintain bonds essential to New France's interests in the fur trade.

Champlain also arranged to have young French men live with local indigenous people, to learn their language and customs and help the French adapt to life in North America. These coureurs des bois ("runners of the woods"), including Étienne Brûlé, extended French influence south and west to the Great Lakes and among the Huron tribes who lived there. Ultimately, for the better part of a century, the Iroquois and French clashed in a series of attacks and reprisals.

During the first decades of the colony's existence, only a few hundred French people lived there, while the English colonies to the south were much more populous and wealthier. Cardinal Richelieu, adviser to Louis XIII, wished to make New France as significant as the English colonies. In 1627, Richelieu founded the Company of One Hundred Associates to invest in New France, promising land parcels to hundreds of new settlers and to turn Canada into an important mercantile and farming colony. He named Champlain as the Governor of New France and forbade non-Roman Catholics to live there. Consequently, any Protestant emigrants to New France were forced to convert to Catholicism, prompting many of them to relocate to the English colonies instead.

The Roman Catholic Church, and missionaries such as the Recollets and the Jesuits, became firmly established in the territory. Richelieu also introduced the seigneurial system, a semi-feudal system of farming based on ribbon farms that remained a characteristic feature of the St. Lawrence valley until the 19th century. While Richelieu's efforts did little to increase the French presence in New France, they did pave the way for the success of later efforts.

Simultaneously, the English colonies to the south began raiding the St. Lawrence Valley, also capturing and holding Quebec until 1632. Champlain returned to Canada that year and requested that Sieur de Laviolette found another trading post at Trois-Rivières, which Laviolette did in 1634. Champlain died in 1635.

On 23 September 1646, under the command of Pierre LeGardeur, Le Cardinal arrived to Quebec with Jules (Gilles) Trottier II and his family. Le Cardinal, commissioned by the Communauté des Habitants, had arrived from La Rochelle, France. Communauté des Habitants at the time of Trottier traded fur primarily. On 4 July 1646, by Pierre Teuleron, sieur de Repentigny, granted Trottier land in La Rochelle to build and develop New France, under the authorization Jacques Le Neuf de la Poterie.

Royal takeover and attempts to settle

In 1650, New France had seven hundred colonists and Montreal had only a few dozen settlers. Because the First Nations people did most of the work of beaver hunting, the company needed few French employees. The sparsely-populated New France almost fell to hostile Iroquois forces completely as well. In 1660, settler Adam Dollard des Ormeaux led a Canadian and Huron militia against a much larger Iroquois force; none of the Canadians survived, although they did turn back the Iroquois invasion.

In 1627, Quebec had only eighty-five French colonists and was easily overwhelmed two years later when three English privateers plundered the settlement. In 1663, New France finally became more secure when Louis XIV made it a royal province, taking control away from the Company of One Hundred Associates. In the same year the Société Notre-Dame de Montréal ceded its possessions to the Seminaire de Saint-Sulpice.

The Crown paid for transatlantic passages and offered other incentives to those willing to move to New France as well, after which the population of New France grew to three thousand.

In 1665, Louis XIV sent a French garrison, the Carignan-Salières Regiment, to Quebec. The colonial government was reformed along the lines of the government of France, with the Governor General and Intendant subordinate to the French Minister of the Marine. In 1665, Jean Talon Minister of the Marine accepted an appointment from Jean-Baptiste Colbert as the first Intendant of New France. These reforms limited the power of the Bishop of Quebec, who had held the greatest amount of power after the death of Champlain.

Talon tried reforming the seigneurial system by forcing the seigneurs to reside on their land and limiting the size of the seigneuries, intending to make more land available to new settlers. Talon's attempts failed since very few settlers arrived and the various industries he established failed to surpass the importance of the fur trade.

Settlers and their families

The first settler was brought to Quebec by Champlainthe apothecary Louis Hébert and his family, of Paris. They came expressly to settle, stay in one place to make the New France settlement function. Waves of recruits came in response to the requests for men with specific skills, like farming, apothecaries, blacksmiths. As couples married, cash incentives to have large families were put in place, and were effective.

To strengthen and make the colony the centre of France's colonial empire, Louis XIV decided to send single women, between 15 and 30 years old and known as the King's Daughters, or, in French, les filles du roi, to New France. He also paid for their passages and granted goods or money as their dowries if or when they married. Approximately 800 girls and women went there during 1663–1673. The King's Daughters found husbands among the male settlers new lives for themselves within two years of their respective immigrations. They came on their own choice, many because they could not contract favorable marriages in the French social hierarchy. Primarily, they came from Parisian, Norman, and west-central commoner families. By 1672, the population of New France had risen to 6,700 people, a marked increase from the population of 3,200 people in 1663.

At the same time, the government encouraged marriages with the indigenous peoples and welcomed indentured servants, or engagés sent to New France. The women there contributed to establishing family life, civil society, and rapid demographic growth significantly. There was a high demand for children since they contributed to farmers' prosperity from an early age and they could receive abundant food supplies. Women there also bore about 30% more children than comparable women who remained in France. Landry says, "Canadians had an exceptional diet for their time. This was due to the natural abundance of meat, fish, and pure water; the good food conservation conditions during the winter; and an adequate wheat supply in most years."

Besides household duties, some women participated in the fur trade, the major source of money in New France. They worked at home alongside their husbands or fathers as merchants, clerks, and provisioners. Some were widows who took over their husbands' roles. Some even became independent and active entrepreneurs.

Settlements in Louisiana

The French extended their territorial claim to the south and to the west of the American colonies late in the 17th century, naming it for King Louis XIV, as La Louisiane. In 1682, René-Robert Cavelier, Sieur de La Salle explored the Ohio River Valley and the Mississippi River Valley, and he claimed the entire territory for France as far south as the Gulf of Mexico.

La Salle attempted to establish the first southern colony in the new territory in 1685, but inaccurate maps and navigational issues led him to instead establish his Fort Saint Louis in what is now Texas. The colony was devastated by disease, and the surviving settlers were killed in 1688, in an attack by the area's indigenous population. Other parts of Louisiana were settled and developed with success, such as New Orleans and southern Illinois, leaving a strong French influence in these areas long after the Louisiana Purchase.

Many strategic forts were built there, under the orders of Governor Louis de Buade de Frontenac. Forts were also built in the older portions of New France that had not yet been settled. Many of these forts were garrisoned by the Troupes de la Marine, the only regular soldiers in New France between 1683 and 1755.

Growth of the settlements

The European population grew slowly under French rule, thus remained relatively low as growth was largely achieved through natural births, rather than by immigration. Most of the French were farmers, and the rate of natural increase among the settlers themselves was very high. The women had about 30 per cent more children than comparable women who remained in France. Yves Landry says, "Canadians had an exceptional diet for their time." The 1666 census of New France was the first census conducted in North America. It was organized by Jean Talon, the first Intendant of New France, between 1665 and 1666. According to Talon's census there were 3,215 people in New France, comprising 538 separate families. The census showed a great difference in the number of men at 2,034 versus 1,181 women.

By the early 1700s the New France settlers were well established along the Saint Lawrence River and Acadian Peninsula with a population around 15,000 to 16,000. The first population figures for Acadia are from 1671, which enumerated only 450 people.

After the Treaty of Utrecht in 1713, New France began to prosper. Industries such as fishing and farming, which had failed under Talon, began to flourish. A "King's Highway" (Chemin du Roy) was built between Montreal and Quebec to encourage faster trade. The shipping industry also flourished as new ports were built and old ones were upgraded. The number of colonists greatly increased. By 1720, Canada had become a self-sufficient colony with a population of 24,594. 
Mainly due to natural increase and modest immigration from Northwest France (Brittany, Normandy, Île-de-France, Poitou-Charentes and Pays de la Loire) the population of Canada increased to 55,000 according to the last French census of 1754. This was an increase from 42,701 in 1730. By 1765, the population approached 70,000.

By 1714, the Acadian population had expanded to over 2,500 and to about 13,000 people by the end of the 1750s. This was mostly from natural increase rather than immigration that affected other French settlements.

European population of Louisiana is estimated at around 5,000 by the 1720s. This would dramatically change in the mid-1730s with the loss of 2,000 French settlers and the introduction of African slaves. Enslaved men, women and children represented approximately 65 percent of the 6,000 non-indigenous population of Louisiana by the end of French rule.

Fur trade and economy

According to the staples thesis, the economic development of New France was marked by the emergence of successive economies based on staple commodities, each of which dictated the political and cultural settings of the time. During the 16th and early 17th centuries New France's economy was heavily centered on its Atlantic fisheries. This would change in the later half of the 17th and 18th centuries as French settlement penetrated further into the continental interior. Here French economic interests would shift and concentrate itself on the development of the North American fur trade. It would soon become the new staple good that would strengthen and drive New France's economy, in particular that of Montreal, for the next century.

The trading post of Ville-Marie, established on the current island of Montreal, quickly became the economic hub for the French fur trade. It achieved this in great part due to its particular location along the St. Lawrence River. From here a new economy emerged, one of size and density that provided increased economic opportunities for the inhabitants of New France. In December 1627 the Company of New France was recognized and given commercial rights to the gathering and export of furs from French territories. By trading with various indigenous populations and securing the main markets its power grew steadily for the next decade. As a result, it was able to set specific price points for furs and other valuable goods, often doing so to protect its economic hegemony over other trading partners and other areas of the economy.

The fur trade itself was based on a commodity of small bulk but high value. Because of this it managed to attract increased attention and/or input capital that would otherwise be intended for other areas of the economy. The Montreal area witnessed a stagnant agricultural sector; it remained for the most part subsistence orientated with little or no trade purposes outside of the French colony. This was a prime example of the handicapping effect the fur trade had on its neighbouring areas of the economy.

Nonetheless, by the beginning of the 1700s the economic prosperity the fur trade stimulated slowly transformed Montreal. Economically, it was no longer a town of small traders or of fur fairs but rather a city of merchants and of bright lights. The primary sector of the fur trade, the act of acquiring and the selling of the furs, quickly promoted the growth of complementary second and tertiary sectors of the economy. For instance a small number of tanneries was established in Montreal as well as a larger number of inns, taverns and markets that would support the growing number of inhabitants whose livelihood depended on the fur trade. Already by 1683 there were well over 140 families and there may have been as many as 900 people living in Montreal.

The founding of the Compagnie des Indes in 1718, once again highlighted the economic importance of the fur trade. This merchant association, like its predecessor the Compagnie des Cent Associés, regulated the fur trade to the best of its abilities imposing price points, supporting government sale taxes and combating black market practices. However, by the middle half of the 18th century the fur trade was in a slow decline.

The natural abundance of furs had passed and it could no longer meet market demand. This eventually resulted in the repeal of the 25 percent sales tax that had previously aimed at curbing the administrative costs New France had accumulated. In addition, dwindling supply increased black market trading. A greater number of indigenous groups and fur traders began circumventing Montreal and New France altogether; many began trading with either British or Dutch merchants to the south.

By the end of French rule in New France in 1763, the fur trade had significantly lost its importance as the key staple good that supported much of New France's economy for more than the last century. Even so, it did serve as the fundamental force behind the establishment and vast growth of Montreal and the French colony.

Coureurs des bois and voyageurs

The coureurs des bois were responsible for starting the flow of trade from Montreal, carrying French goods into upper territories while indigenous people were bringing down their furs. The coureurs traveled with intermediate trading tribes, and found that they were anxious to prevent French access to the more distant fur-hunting tribes. Still, the coureurs kept thrusting outwards using the Ottawa River as their initial step upon the journey and keeping Montreal as their starting point. The Ottawa River was significant because it offered a route that was practical for Europeans, by taking the traders northward out of the territory dominated by the Iroquois. It was for this reason that Montreal and the Ottawa River was a central location of indigenous warfare and rivalry.

Montreal faced difficulties by having too many coureurs out in the woods. The furs coming down were causing an oversupply on the markets of Europe. This challenged the coureurs trade because they so easily evaded controls, monopolies, and taxation, and additionally because the coureurs trade was held to debauch both French and various indigenous groups. The coureur debauched Frenchmen by accustoming them to fully live with indigenous, and indigenous by trading on their desire for alcohol.

The issues caused a great rift in the colony, and in 1678, it was confirmed by a General Assembly that the trade was to be made in public so as to better assure the safety of the indigenous population. It was also forbidden to take spirits inland to trade with indigenous groups. However, these restrictions on the coureurs, for a variety of reasons, never worked. The fur trade remained dependent on spirits, and increasingly in the hands of the coureurs who journeyed north in search of furs.

As time passed, the Coureurs des bois were partially replaced by licensed fur trading endeavors, and the main canoe travel workers of those endeavors were called voyageurs.

Indigenous peoples
The two factions, Iroquois and French, were constantly at war with one another until the Great Peace of Montréal in 1701. The relationship between the Iroquois and the French first began in 1609. The relationship between the French and Iroquois began violently. As Samuel De Champlain travelled from the St. Lawrence Valley, accompanied by his Algonquin, Montagnais, and Huron allies, the killing of three Iroquoian chiefs on Lake Champlain was Champlain’s way of fortifying his stance with these other tribal allies. These alliances were in the interest of the fur trade.

The French and Algonquins first encountered one another in 1603 after Samuel de Champlain established France's first permanent North American settlement along the St. Lawrence River. In 1610, the Algonquins continued to solidify their relations with the French by guiding Étienne Brûlé into the interiors of Canada.

The relationship between the Iroquois and the French first began in 1609, where Samuel De Champlain engaged in battle against the Iroquois. Champlain travelled from the St. Lawrence Valley, accompanied by his Algonquin, Montagnais, and Huron allies, to kill three Iroquoian chiefs on Lake Champlain with the first shots of his arquebus. The two factions (Iroquois and French) were constantly at war with one another until the Great Peace of Montréal in 1701.

The French were interested in exploiting the land through the fur trade as well as the timber trade later on. Despite having tools and guns, the French settlers were dependent on Indigenous people to survive in the difficult climate in this part of North America. Many settlers did not know how to survive through the winter; the Indigenous people showed them how to survive in the New World. They showed the settlers how to hunt for food and to use the furs for clothing that would protect them during the winter months.

As the fur trade became the dominant economy in the New World, French voyageurs, trappers and hunters often married or formed relationships with Indigenous women. This allowed the French to develop relations with their wives' Indigenous nations, which in turn provided protection and access to their hunting and trapping grounds.

One specific Indigenous group borne of these relationships are the Métis people, who are descendants of marriages between French men and Indigenous women. Their name originates from an old French term for “person of mixed parentage.” At the beginning of the fur trade, these relationships were encouraged by the French as a way to encourage the First Nations to adopt French culture and solidify alliances, but as the Métis began to emerge as an independent culture around the 1700s, it began to be discouraged by the French. Many Métis families moved to western Canada in response to this, as well as for other reasons, such as fur trading opportunities. One major settlement at this time was in the Red River Valley, strategically placed in a significant area for the fur trade. This was the origin of the modern Métis nation, which was legally recognized by modern Canada as a protected Indigenous group in the Constitution Act, 1982. Its prior legal history has its roots in acts such as the Manitoba Act, 1870, which began to recognize the Métis nation as a separate group with various rights and protections, but was not supported by the vast majority of Métis as it removed many from land that was rightfully theirs.

The fur trade benefited Indigenous people as well. They traded furs for metal tools and other European-made items that made their lives easier. Tools such as knives, pots and kettles, nets, firearms and hatchets improved the general welfare of indigenous peoples. At the same time, while everyday life became easier, some traditional ways of doing things were abandoned or altered, and while Indigenous people embraced many of these implements and tools, they also were exposed to less vital trade goods, such as alcohol and sugar, sometimes with deleterious effects. The Iroquois, like most tribes, began to rely on the importation of European goods, like firearms, which contributed significantly to a decrease in the beaver population of the Hudson Valley. This decline resulted in the fur trade moving further north, along the St. Lawrence River.

Formal entry of England in New France area fur trade

Since Henry Hudson had claimed Hudson Bay, and the surrounding lands for England in 1611, English colonists had begun expanding their boundaries across what is now the Canadian north beyond the French-held territory of New France. In 1670, King Charles II of England issued a charter to Prince Rupert and "the Company of Adventurers of England trading into Hudson Bay" for an English monopoly in harvesting furs in Rupert's Land, a portion of the land draining into Hudson Bay. This is the start of the Hudson's Bay Company, ironically aided by French coureurs des bois, Pierre-Esprit Radisson and Médard des Groseilliers, frustrated with French license rules. Now both France and England were formally in the Canadian fur trade.

The economy of La Louisiane

The major commercial importance of the Louisiana Purchase territory was the Mississippi River. New Orleans, the largest and most important city in the territory, was the most commercial city in the United States until the Civil War, with most jobs there being related to trade and shipping; there was little manufacturing. The first commercial shipment to come down the Mississippi River was of deer and bear hides in 1705. The area, always loosely defined in those early times of European claims and settlements, extended as far east as the city that is now Mobile, Alabama, begun by French settlers in 1702.

The French (later Spanish) Louisiana Territory was owned by France for a number of years before the money-losing territory was transferred to French banker Antoine Crozat in 1713 for 15 years. After losing four times his investment, Crozat gave up his charter in 1717. Control of Louisiana and its 700 inhabitants was given to the Company of the Indies in 1719. The company conducted a major settlement program by recruiting European settlers to locate in the territory. Unemployed persons, convicts and prostitutes were also sent to the Louisiana Territory. After the bankruptcy of the company in 1720, control was returned to the king.

Louis XV saw little value in Louisiana, and to compensate Spain for its losses in the Seven Years' War, he transferred Louisiana to his cousin Charles III in 1762. Louisiana remained under the control of Spain until it was demanded to be turned over to France by Napoleon. Although Louisiana was property of France by the Third Treaty of San Ildefonso in 1800, Louisiana continued to be administered by Spain until the Louisiana Purchase in 1803. Following the American acquisition of the territory, its population tripled between 1803 and Louisiana statehood in 1812.

Religion

Before the arrival of European colonists and explorers, First Nations followed a wide array of mostly animistic religions. During the colonial period, the French settled along the shores of the Saint Lawrence River, specifically Latin Rite Roman Catholics, including a number of Jesuits dedicated to converting the indigenous population; an effort that eventually proved successful.

The French Roman Catholic Church, which after Champlain's death was the dominant force in New France, wanted to establish a Christian community in the colony. In 1642, they sponsored a group of settlers, led by Paul Chomedey de Maisonneuve, who founded Ville-Marie, precursor to present-day Montreal, farther up the St. Lawrence. Throughout the 1640s, Jesuit missionaries penetrated the Great Lakes region and converted many of the Huron. The missionaries came into conflict with the Iroquois, who frequently attacked Montreal.

The presence of Jesuit missionaries in Huron society was nonnegotiable. The Huron relied on French goods to facilitate life and warfare. Because the French would refuse trade to all indigenous societies that denied relations with missionaries, the Huron had more of a propensity towards Christian conversion. The Huron heavily relied on European goods to perform burial ceremonies known as The Huron Feast of the Dead. Trading with the French allowed for larger amounts of decorative goods to be buried during ceremonies as opposed to only a bare minimum. With the growing epidemics and high number of deaths, the Huron could not afford to lose relations with the French, fearing to anger their ancestors.

Jesuit missionaries explored the Mississippi River, in the territory of the Illinois. Father Jacques Marquette and explorer Louis Jolliet traveled in a small party, starting from Green Bay down the Wisconsin River to the Mississippi River, communicating with the tribes they met en route. Although Spanish trade goods had reached most of the indigenous peoples, these were the first Frenchmen to connect in the area named for the Illinois, including the Kaskaskia. They kept detailed records of what they saw and the people they met, sketching what they could, and mapped the Mississippi River in 1673. Their travels were described as first contacts with the indigenous peoples, though evidence of contact with Spanish from the south was clear.

Subsequent to the arrival of French children in Quebec in 1634, measles was also brought along with them, which quickly spread among the indigenous peoples. Jesuit priest Jean de Brébeuf described the symptoms as being severe. Brebeuf stated that the fearlessness of the indigenous peoples towards death upon this disease made them perfect candidates for conversion to Christianity. The indigenous peoples believed that if they did not convert to Christianity, they would be exposed to the evil magic of the priests that caused the illness. 

Jesuit missionaries were troubled by the absence of patriarchy in indigenous communities. Indigenous women were highly regarded within their societies and participated in political and military decisions. Jesuits attempted to eliminate the matriarchy and shift the powers of men and women to accommodate those of European societies. "In France, women are to be obedient to their masters, their husbands." Jesuits would attempt to justify this to the indigenous women in hopes to enlighten them on proper European behavior. In response, Indigenous women grew worrisome of the presence of these missionaries fearing they would lose power and freedom within their communities. By 1649, both the Jesuit mission and the Huron society were almost destroyed by Iroquois invasions (see Canadian Martyrs). In 1653, a peace invitation was extended by the Onondaga Nation, one of the five nations of the Iroquois Confederacy, to New France, and an expedition of Jesuits, led by Simon Le Moyne, established Sainte Marie de Ganentaa in 1656. The Jesuits were forced to abandon the mission by 1658, as hostilities with the Iroquois resumed.

The second article of the charter of the Compagnie des Cent-Associés stated that New France could only be Roman Catholic. This resulted in Huguenots facing legal restrictions to enter the colony when Cardinal Richelieu transferred the control of the colony to Compagnie des Cent-Associés in 1627. Protestantism was then outlawed in France and all its overseas possessions by the Edict of Fontainebleau in 1685. In spite of that, approximately 15,000 Protestants settled in New France by using socioeconomic pretexts while at the same time concealing their religious background.

The Huguenots (a name used to designate French-Speaking Protestants) were a mercantile group, originating from the coastal cities of North-Western France, and had a significant impact on the early development of New France, especially in the regions of Quebec and Acadia, where many people still hold Huguenot surnames to this day. Huguenots were famous for their large and interconnected trading and communication network that spanned throughout France, and most of her colonies. This network was also known for trading with the Dutch Republic, and the Kingdom of England; two of France’s most important rivals, that also happened to be protestant nations.

Initially, King Henri IV recognised Protestants as a significant minority within France, and allowed them a certain degree of freedom within their religion. After several years of various skirmishes within Metropolitan France, the Huguenots were deemed to not be "faithful servants of the king", and their mercantile powers stripped, their trading network disbanded, and widespread governmental persecutory policies were enacted both within mainland France and Nouvelle France. In 1661, Louis XVI was able to enact self-rule as his regency ended, and he instituted a variety of anti-protestant conventions throughout the greater French Empire. Under these new rules, Protestant children were forcibly converted to Catholicism, implemented direct governmental jurisdiction over what were formerly Huguenot-controlled trade routes, and labelled the Protestant communities throughout Nouvelle France (specifically Quebec and Acadia) as significant threats to the colonies, as they might sympathise with English Protestants competing in the same areas and trades. Eventually, Protestants were banned from settling in Nouvelle France, and the existing ones were only allowed to "summer" in the colonies, not "winter" there.

Judiciary of New France

Early history in New France (pre-1663)

In the early stage of French settlement, legal matters fell within the Governor of New France's purview. Under this arrangement, legal disputes were settled in an incoherent fashion due to the Governor's arbitrariness in issuing verdicts.

Since 1640, a Seneschal (sénéchal), a Judge (juge d'épée, which literally means 'sword-bearing judge'), and a jurisdiction in Trois-Rivières were created. However, the Seneschal was under the oversight by the Governor, hence the Governor still had rather extensive control over legal matters in New France. In 1651, the Company of New France made the Great Seneschal (Grand Sénéchal) the chief justice. However, the Island of Montreal had its special Governor at that time, who also administered justice on the Island, and had not handed over justice to the Grand Seneschal until 1652.

In practice, though, the Great Seneschal was awarded as an honorary title to the son of Jean de Lauson, then Governor of New France; judicial functions were in fact carried out by the Seneschal's deputies. These deputies included such officials as the civil and criminal lieutenant general (lieutenant général civil et criminel), the special lieutenant (lieutenant particulier, acting as assistant royal judge), and the lieutenant fiscal (lieutenant fiscal, acting as tax magistrate).

The Civil and Criminal Lieutenant General sat as judge in trials at first instance, whereas appeals would be adjudicated by the Governor, who held the sovereign right to settle final appeals on behalf of the French king. The Great Seneschal also had a magistrate in Trois-Rivières, as well as a bailiff formed by the Society of Priests of Saint Sulpice on the Island of Montreal.

Apart from judicial responsibilities, the Great Seneschal was also in charge of convening local nobility in New France, as well as issuing declarations of war if necessary. However, such alternative role of the Great Seneschal was much weakened soon after by having the rights to declare war and to administer finances stripped off from the office because the French crown feared that colonial officers held too much authority.

Legal reforms (1663)

Royal judges and the Sovereign Council
On 13 October 1663, the royal court replaced the Seneschal Office (sénéchaussée). Canada was divided into three districts: the district of Quebec City, the district of Trois-Rivières, and the district of Montreal. Each district had its own separate jurisdiction with a judge appointed by the Crown, known as the civil and criminal lieutenants general. They were responsible for all legal matters, civil and criminal, in each of the districts.

In addition to the royal judges, there were other judicial officers in each district. The clerk of court (registrar) was responsible for transcribing all court proceedings as well as other documents relevant to each of the cases. The king's attorney (procureur du roi) was responsible for inquiring into the facts and preparing the case against the accused. In the districts of Quebec City and Montreal, the royal judges had special lieutenants to substitute them whenever they were absent or sick. Feudal courts heard minor cases.

The reform also brought the Sovereign Council of New France (Conseil souverain) into existence, which was later renamed the Superior Council (Conseil supérieur). The Sovereign Council effectively acted as the functional equivalent of a Council of State (Conseil d'État) for New France, having the authority to hand down verdicts on final appeal. Initially, the Council convened once every week, and the quorum of the Sovereign Council was seven for criminal matters, or five for civil cases. The council's practices evolved over time. At the Sovereign Council there was a king's attorney-general (procureur général du roi) in charge of the similar tasks as the district king's attorneys. He was also responsible for supervising the king's attorneys' daily operations as well as execution of royal edicts and regulations passed by the council in their respective districts.

The Custom of Paris

In 1664, the Custom of Paris (coutume de Paris) was formally set as the main source of law for civil law in France's overseas empire. All royal judges and king's attorneys in New France had to be thoroughly familiar with this compilation of rules. The Custom governed various civil aspects of the daily life in New France, including property, marriage, inheritance, and so on.

Montreal Island: transition from feudal justice to royal justice
The Island of Montreal was a special case because its judiciary had been previously held by the Society of St-Sulpice. In 1663, Governor-General of New France Augustin de Saffray de Mésy originally considered appointing Paul de Chomedey, Sieur de Maisonneuve the Governor of the Island of Montreal and consolidating a royal jurisdiction on the island, but the plan garnered the St-Sulpicians' disapproval, who held the Island as its own fiefdom and effectively acted as the island's governor. In other words, the Sovereign Council had not been able to seize effective control over the legal matters of the Island; instead, the St-Sulpicians administered justice on the island.

It was not until 16 September 1666, that the St-Sulpicians finally handed over the justice of the Island of Montreal to the Intendant of New France. In 1693, the French king commanded the replacement of the ecclesiastical courts in Montreal with a royal court composed of one royal judge, with appeals going to the Sovereign Council. The introduction of a royal court on the Montreal Island also resulted in the abolition of the feudal court in the fief of Trois-Rivières (then held by the Jesuits).

Quebec: founding of the Provostry of Quebec
In the Quebec City district, the lower court (tribunal antérieur) was established in 1664 and had jurisdiction to try cases at first instance, but then it was abolished in 1674. The Sovereign Council appointed trial judges (juges inférieurs) to adjudicate cases at first instance until the Provostry of Quebec (prévôté de Québec) was created in May 1677.

The Provostry of Quebec was located in the Hall of Justice (palais de justice) in Quebec City and had only one royal judge, also known as the civil and criminal lieutenant general of Quebec City, who heard both civil and criminal cases, as well as district police. Additionally, a court clerk and a king's attorney were appointed to the court; if either of these two officers could not attend the trials due to illness or other untenable circumstances, the Intendant would appoint a temporary substitute.

Criminal justice

In the early stages of French colonization, the execution of criminal justice in New France was rather arbitrary. The Governor of New France served as the judge to the colonists as well as soldiers. He would announce his verdict at the presence of the chiefs of the Company of One Hundred Associates and that would be final.

After the Sovereign Council was established in Quebec in 1663, the Council carried out criminal justice according to the general ordinances of France. In 1670, the Criminal Ordinance was enacted in New France by order of the French king as a codification of the previous criminal laws passed by the Sovereign Council.

Special courts

Ecclesiastical court

The ecclesiastical court (tribunal ecclésiastique, or Officialité) was a special court for hearing first instance trials on both religious and secular affairs involving members of the Church. It first appeared in around 1660 but was not officially recognized by state authorities for it was not administered by a bishop, until 1684. Appeals from this court lay with the Sovereign Council.

Admiralty court
The court of admiralty was created on 12 January 1717 and was the last judicial body set up in Canada during the French colonial period. The court had a judge (also known as the lieutenant-general of the court) appointed by the French admiralty, a king's attorney, a clerk of court, and one or two bailiffs (huissiers). The admiralty court was located in Quebec City and had jurisdiction over all of New France except Louisiana and Louisbourg. The court heard first instance trials on maritime affairs, including commerce and seamen's conduct. During wartime, it also commanded maritime police. Before 1717, the Quebec Provostry performed the duties of the admiralty court.

Acadia
Unlike Canada, Acadia's judicial system was somewhat under-developed during the New France period. Prior to 1670, Acadia was in a state of being torn between various European colonists. None of the countries—France, England, the Netherlands—were able to put in place a stable jurisdiction there.

In 1670, France regained control of Acadia and appointed Mathieu de Goutin as the Civil and Criminal Lieutenant (lieutenant civil et criminel) of Acadia. Simultaneously, the Governor of Acadia was set up and his job was primarily the defense of Acadia from English invasion. The Civil and Criminal Lieutenant was essentially supervised by the Governor, who held superior judicial authority over the Lieutenant, but for most of the time would let the Lieutenant mediate and decide legal affairs.

Due to the situation in Acadia as a small settlement of around 399 settlers in 1670–71, vulnerable to foreign invasion, courts were minimal, consisting of only a Civil and Criminal Lieutenant and a king's attorney. There was not an official court in Acadia, although the king's attorney of Acadia performed very similar duties as his counterpart in New France. Yet since Acadia never actually had a court, there was no clerk of court; instead, trials were recorded by a local notary. It is difficult to trace the judicial history of French Acadia as the relevant archives were destroyed in a fire in 1708.

Military conflicts

The presence of settlers, of businesses from several European countries harvesting furs, along with the interests of the indigenous people in this new competition for North American resources set the scene for significant military conflicts among all parties in New France beginning in 1642, and ending with the Seven Years' War, 1756–1763.

Iroquois attacks against Montreal

Ville-Marie was a noteworthy site for it was the center of defence against the Iroquois, the point of departure for all western and northern journeys, and the meeting point to which the trading Indians brought their annual furs. This placed Ville-Marie, later known as Montreal, at the forefront against the Iroquois, which resulted in its trade being easily and frequently interrupted. The Iroquois were in alliance with the Dutch and English, which allowed them to interrupt the French fur trade and send the furs down the Hudson River to the Dutch and English traders.

This also put the Iroquois at warfare against the Hurons, the Algonquians, and any other tribes that were in alliance with the French. If the Iroquois could destroy New France and its Indian allies, they would be able to trade freely and profitably with the Dutch and English on the Hudson River. The Iroquois formally attacked the settlement at today's Quebec City in its foundation year of 1642, and in almost every subsequent year thereafter. A militant theocracy maintained Montreal. In 1653 and 1654, reinforcements arrived at Montreal, which allowed the Iroquois to be halted. In that year the Iroquois made peace with the French.

Adam Dollard des Ormeaux, a colonist and soldier of New France, was a notable figure regarding the Iroquois attacks against Montreal. The Iroquois soon resumed their assaults against Montreal, and the few settlers of Montreal fell almost completely to hostile Iroquois forces. The Iroquois did not use typical raiding tactics of moving swiftly and silently. Instead, they captured individuals and brought them back to their own territory. Women and children were made a part of the village, and men encountered slow torturous deaths. In the ’60s, warfare changed, and France began to counterattack. Professional French soldiers had arrived in the New World for the first time, and Alexandre de Prouville led them to invade Iroquois territory. In the spring of 1660, Adam Dollard des Ormeaux led a small militia consisting of 16 men from Montreal against a much larger Iroquois force at the Battle of Long Sault on the Ottawa River. They succeeded in turning back the Iroquois invasion and are responsible for saving Montreal from destruction. They were able to take Chief Canaqueese as a prisoner, and in September 1660, the French returned and burned Iroquois homes and crops. Later that Winter, many Iroquois died due to starvation, and the Iroquois finally agreed to peace which lasted roughly twenty years. The encounter between Ormeaux and the Iroquois is of significance because it dissuaded the Iroquois from further attacks against Montreal.

King William's War

In 1688, King William's War began and the English and Iroquois launched a major assault on New France, after many years of small skirmishes throughout the English and French territories. New France and the Wabanaki Confederacy were able to thwart New England expansion into Acadia, whose border New France defined as the Kennebec River in southern Maine. King William's War ended in 1697, but a second war (Queen Anne's War) broke out in 1702. Quebec survived the English invasions of both these wars, and during the wars France seized many of the English Hudson's Bay Company fur trading centres on Hudson Bay including York Factory, which the French renamed Fort Bourbon.

Queen Anne's War

While Acadia defeated an English invasion attempt during King William's War, the colony was occupied by the British during Queen Anne's War. The final Conquest of Acadia happened in 1710. In 1713, peace came to New France with the Treaty of Utrecht. Although the treaty turned Hudson Bay, Newfoundland and part of Acadia (peninsular Nova Scotia) over to Great Britain, France remained in control of Île Royale (Cape Breton Island) (which also administered Île Saint-Jean (Prince Edward Island)). The northern part of Acadia, what is today New Brunswick and Maine, remained contested territory. Construction of Fortress Louisbourg on Île Royale, a French military stronghold intended to protect the approaches to the St. Lawrence River settlements, began in 1719.

Father Rale's War

In Acadia, however, war continued. Father Rale's War (1722–1725) was a series of battles between New England and the Wabanaki Confederacy, who were allied with New France. New France and the Wabanaki Confederacy defended against the expansion of New England settlements into Acadia, whose border New France defined as the Kennebec River in southern Maine. After the New England Conquest of Acadia in 1710, mainland Nova Scotia was under the control of New England, but both present-day New Brunswick and virtually all of present-day Maine remained contested territory between New England and New France. To secure New France's claim to the region, it established Catholic missions among the three largest indigenous villages in the region: one on the Kennebec River (Norridgewock); one further north on the Penobscot River (Penobscot) and one on the Saint John River (Medoctec).

The war began on two fronts: when New England pushed its way through Maine and when New England established itself at Canso, Nova Scotia. As a result of the war, Maine fell to the New Englanders with the defeat of Father Sébastien Rale at Norridgewock and the subsequent retreat of the indigenous peoples from the Kennebec and Penobscot rivers to St. Francis and Becancour, Quebec.

King George's War

Peace lasted in Canada until 1744, when news of the outbreak of the War of the Austrian Succession (King George's War in North America) reached Fort Louisbourg. The French forces went on the attack first in a failed attempt to capture Annapolis Royal, the capital of British Nova Scotia. In 1745, William Shirley, governor of Massachusetts, led a counterattack on Louisbourg. Both France and New France were unable to relieve the siege, and Louisbourg fell to the British. With the famed Duc d'Anville Expedition, France attempted to retake Acadia and the fortress in 1746 but failed. The fortress was returned to France under the Treaty of Aix-la-Chapelle, but the peace treaty, which restored all colonial borders to their pre-war status, did little to end the lingering enmity between France, Britain, and their respective colonies, nor did it resolve any territorial disputes.

Father Le Loutre's War

Within Acadia and Nova Scotia, Father Le Loutre's War (1749–1755) began with the British founding of Halifax. During Father Le Loutre's War, New France established three forts along the border of present-day New Brunswick to protect it from a New England attack from Nova Scotia. The war continued until British victory at Fort Beausejour, which dislodged Father Le Loutre from the region, thereby ending his alliance with the Maliseet, Acadians and Mi'kmaq.

French and Indian War

Fort Duquesne, located at the confluence of the Allegheny and Monongahela Rivers at the site of present-day Pittsburgh, Pennsylvania, guarded the most important strategic location in the west at the time of the Seven Years' War. It was built to ensure that the Ohio River valley remained under French control. A small colonial force from Virginia began a fort here, but a French force under Claude-Pierre Pécaudy de Contrecœur drove them off in April 1754. New France claimed this as part of their colony, and the French were anxious to keep the British from encroaching on it. The French built Fort Duquesne here to serve as a military stronghold and as a base for developing trade and strengthening military alliances with the indigenous peoples of the area.

In 1755, General Edward Braddock led an expedition against Fort Duquesne, and although they were numerically superior to the French militia and their Indian allies, Braddock's army was routed and Braddock was killed. Later that same year at the Battle of Lake George, the British General William Johnson with a force of 1700 American and Iroquois troops defeated a French force of 2800 French and Canadians and 700 Native Americans led by Baron Dieskau (Military commander of New France).

The fight for control over Ohio Country led to the French and Indian War, which began as the North American phase of the Seven Years' War (which did not technically begin in Europe until 1756). The war began with the defeat of a Virginia militia contingent led by Colonel George Washington by the French troupes de la marine in the Ohio valley. As a result of that defeat, the British decided to prepare the conquest of Quebec City, the capital of New France. The British defeated France in Acadia in the Battle of Fort Beausejour (1755) and then Île Royale (Cape Breton Island) (which also administered Île Saint-Jean (Prince Edward Island) with the Siege of Louisbourg (1758).

Throughout the war, the British deported the Acadians to the Thirteen Colonies and Europe, which the Acadian militias resisted with assistance from Mi'kmaq and Malisteet forces. The Great Upheaval continued from 1755 to 1764. In 1756, a large force of French, Canadians, and their Native American allies led by the Marquis de Montcalm launched an attack against the key British post at Fort Oswego on Lake Ontario from Fort Frontenac and forced the garrison to surrender. The following year Montcalm with a huge force of 7,200 French and Canadian troops and 2,400 Native Americans laid siege to Fort William Henry on the southern shores of Lake George, and after three weeks of fighting the British commander Monroe surrendered. Montcalm gave him honorable terms to return to England and not to fight for 18 months. And yet, when the British force with civilians was three miles from the fort, the Native American allies massacred about 1,100 of the 1,500 strong force.

The following year the French had one victory and one defeat. The defeat was at the French fortress city of Louisbourg. The victory was at the strip of land between Lake Champlain and Lake George at the French fortress of Fort Carillon. The British force sent to capture Fort Carillon (held by just 3400 French regulars and marines with almost no militia or indigenous support) was the largest ever seen in America at that time: 16,200 British, American, and Iroquois troops under the command of General James Abercrombie. This battle led the British to suffer 2,200 casualties, several artillery pieces against French losses of around 200 killed or wounded.

While the British Conquest of Acadia happened in 1710, the French continued to remain a significant force in the region with Fort Beausejour and Fortress Louisbourg. The dominant population in the region remained Acadian, that is to say, not British. In 1755, the British were successful in the Battle of Beausejour and immediately after began the expulsion of the Acadians.

In the meantime the French continued to explore westwards and expand their trade alliances with indigenous peoples. Fort de la Corne was built in 1753, by Louis de la Corne, Chevalier de la Corne just east of the Saskatchewan River Forks in what is today the Canadian province of Saskatchewan. This was the furthest westward outpost of the French Empire in North America to be established before its fall.

Treaties of cession

In 1758, British forces again captured Louisbourg, allowing them to blockade the entrance to the St. Lawrence River. This proved decisive in the war. In 1759, the British besieged Quebec by sea, and an army under General James Wolfe defeated the French under General Louis-Joseph de Montcalm at the Battle of the Plains of Abraham in September. The garrison in Quebec surrendered on 18 September, and by the next year New France had been conquered by the British after the attack on Montreal, which had refused to acknowledge the fall of Canada. The last French governor-general of New France, Pierre François de Rigaud, Marquis de Vaudreuil-Cavagnal, surrendered to British Major General Jeffery Amherst on 8 September 1760. France formally ceded Canada to the British in the Treaty of Paris, signed 10 February 1763.

Aftermath

The expelled Acadians were initially dispersed across much of eastern North America (including the Thirteen Colonies) and some were sent to France. Many eventually settled in Quebec or Louisiana, while others returned to the regions of New Brunswick and Nova Scotia. Chéticamp, Nova Scotia and the Magdalen Islands have significant communities. In Louisiana their descendants became known as the Cajuns, a corruption of the French Acadiens.

By the mid-1700s the French settlers were well established with a population around 70,000, mainly due to natural increase. The European population had grown slowly under French rule. The British Thirteen Colonies to the south along the Atlantic coast grew in population from natural increase and more new settlers from Europe. By 1760, almost 1.6 million people lived in the British colonies, a ratio of approximately twenty-three to one compared to New France. The population of the New England colonies alone in 1760 was nearly 450,000.

French culture and religion remained dominant in most of the former territory of New France until the arrival of British settlers led to the later creation of Upper Canada (today Ontario) and New Brunswick. The Louisiana Territory, under Spanish control since the end of the Seven Years' War, remained off-limits to settlement from the thirteen American colonies.

Twelve years after the British defeated the French, the American Revolutionary War broke out in the Thirteen Colonies. Many French Canadians would take part in the war, including Major Clément Gosselin and Admiral Louis-Philippe de Vaudreuil. After the British surrender at Yorktown in 1781, the Treaty of Versailles gave all former British claims in New France below the Great Lakes into the possession of the nascent United States. A Franco-Spanish alliance treaty returned Louisiana to France in 1801, but French leader Napoleon Bonaparte sold it to the United States in the Louisiana Purchase in 1803, ending French colonial efforts in North America.

The portions of the former New France that remained under British rule were administered as Upper Canada and Lower Canada, 1791–1841, and then those regions were merged as the Province of Canada during 1841–1867, when the passage of the British North America Act of 1867 instituted home rule for most of British North America and established French-speaking Quebec (the former Lower Canada) as one of the original provinces of the Dominion of Canada. The former French colony of Acadia was first designated the Colony of Nova Scotia but shortly thereafter the Colony of New Brunswick, which then included Prince Edward Island, was split off from it.

In Canada, the legacy of New France can be seen in the enduring Francophone identity of its descendants, which has led to institutional bilingualism in Canada as a whole.

Political divisions of New France

Before the Treaty of Utrecht of 1713, the territory of New France was divided into four colonies:

 Acadie
 Canada
 Illinois Country (before 1717)
 Louisiane 
 Louisiana (New France)
 Illinois Country (after 1717)
 Terre-Neuve

The Treaty of Utrecht resulted in the relinquishing of French claims to mainland Acadia, the Hudson Bay and Newfoundland, and the establishment of the colony of Île Royale, now called Cape Breton Island, where the French built the Fortress of Louisbourg.

Acadia had a difficult history, with the Great Upheaval, remembered on July 28 each year since 2003. The descendants are dispersed in the Maritime Provinces of Canada, in Maine and Louisiana in the United States, with small populations in Chéticamp, Nova Scotia, and the Magdalen Islands.

Historiography
The Conquest (referring to the fall of New France to the British, and specifically the events of 1759–60) has always been a central and contested theme of Canadian memory. Some Anglophone historians portray the Conquest as a victory for "British military, political and economic superiority" and argue that it ultimately brought benefits to the French settlers. However, Cornelius Jaenen notes that French-Canadian historians remain strongly divided on the subject. One group sees it as a highly negative economic, political and ideological disaster that threatened a way of life with materialism and Protestantism. At the other pole are those historians who see the positive benefit of enabling the preservation of language, and religion and traditional customs under British rule. French-Canadian debates have escalated since the 1960s, as the conquest is seen as a pivotal moment in the history of Québec's nationalism. Francophone historian Jocelyn Létourneau suggested in 2009, that today, "1759 does not belong primarily to a past that we might wish to study and understand, but, rather, to a present and a future that we might wish to shape and control."

The enduring contestation of the legacy of the Conquest can be exemplified by an episode in 2009, when an attempt to commemorate the 250th anniversary of the battle of the Plains of Abraham was cancelled. The explanation for the cancellation was that it was over security concerns, but activist Sylvain Rocheleau stated, "[I think] they had to cancel the event because it was insulting a majority of Francophones. They had to cancel it because it was a bad idea.".

See also

Alcohol in New France
French Colonial Historic District
List of French possessions and colonies
List of North American cities founded in chronological order
New France Intellectual Life
Slavery in New France
New France Sovereign Council
Seigneurial system of New France
Timeline of New France history

Notes

References

Further reading

  scholarly biographies of all major figures in New France

Older classics

Primary sources

Historiography

In French

External links

 Electronic New France  Internet gateway to everything New France (archives, heritage sites, etc.)
 The Virtual Museum of New France, Canadian Museum of Civilization
 France In America Bibliothèque nationale de France / Library of Congress site (click on Themes)text and maps
 Chronologie de l'histoire du Québec (French)(List of Governors, Intendants, and Bishops) 

 
16th century in North America
17th century in North America
18th century in North America
1534 establishments in North America
1763 disestablishments in North America
Colonial settlements in North America
 
French
European colonization of North America

French exploration in the Age of Discovery
Former colonies in North America
Pre-Confederation Canada
States and territories established in 1534
States and territories disestablished in 1763
Viceroyalties